Milam, can refer to:

 Dream yoga, (T:rmi-lam; S:).

People
 J. B. Milam, chief of the Cherokee Nation
 William Milam, American diplomat
 Benjamin Milam, Texas Revolution figure
 Carl H. Milam, American librarian
 Marcus A. Milam, businessman from Florida
 Lorenzo Milam, American writer and activist

Places
 Milam, Texas
 Milam County, Texas
 Milam, Hardy County, West Virginia
 Milam, Wyoming County, West Virginia
 Milam Glacier, Kumaon Division, Uttarakhand, India
 Milam, India, a village in India
 Milam Branch, a river in Tennessee
 M.A. Milam K-8 Center, a K-8 educational center
 Milam's Markets, a family operated store chain in south florida